Aldo Vollono (born 3 August 1906) was an Italian professional football player.

Honours
 Serie A champion: 1930/31.

1906 births
Year of death missing
Italian footballers
Serie A players
U.S. Triestina Calcio 1918 players
Juventus F.C. players
S.S.C. Bari players
Italian expatriate footballers
Expatriate footballers in France
Italian expatriate sportspeople in France
Ligue 1 players
FC Antibes players
Association football midfielders